Château Gazin is a Bordeaux wine from the appellation Pomerol. The winery is located on the Right Bank of the Bordeaux wine region, in the commune of Pomerol in the department Gironde. As all wine produced in this appellation, Château Gazin is unclassified, but the estate has since the 1840s been estimated among the great growths of Pomerol. 

The château also produces a second wine named l'Hospitalet de Gazin.

History

Originally a farm belonging to the Knights Hospitallers of St. John in the Middle Ages, it was bought in 1772 by the Feuilhade family, one of the pioneers of the local viticultural revolution, when production of quality wine was favoured over cultivating cereal, according to Professor Henri Enjalbert. 

The estate became the property of the Bailliencourt dit Courcols family in 1918, who remains the owners to date. The present proprietors are Nicolas, Christophe, Laure et Inès de Bailliencourt dit Courcol, with Mickaël Obert as winemaker.

Production

The estate consists of 26 hectares with the grape varieties of 90% Merlot, 7% Cabernet Sauvignon and 3% Cabernet Franc. The annual production averages 8,000 cases of the Grand vin Château Gazin, and 2,000 cases of the second wine l'Hospitalet de Gazin.

References

External links
 Château Gazin official site (several languages)

Bordeaux wine producers